Kim Ki-hoon (born July 14, 1967) is a retired short-track speed skater and the first gold medalist in the Winter Olympics for South Korea. Kim is a three-time Olympic Champion and 1992 Overall World Champion.

Career
Kim first garnered attention when he participated in the short-track demonstration event at the 1988 Winter Olympics in Calgary, winning the gold medal in the 1500 metres.

Kim swept all the gold medals available in short-track speed skating at the 1992 Winter Olympics in Albertville, winning won the gold medal in the 1000 metres in a world record time of 1:30.76, and claiming another gold in the 5000 metre relay in a world record time of 7:14.02. Kim went on to win his first world overall champion at the 1992 World Short Track Speed Skating Championships in Denver. At the championships, Kim captured all five individual gold medals (overall, 500 m, 1000 m, 1500 m, 3000 m), which made him become the second skater to sweep all five individual world championship gold medals available(Canada's Sylvie Daigle first achieved the feat at the 1983 World Championships), and the first male one.

Kim Ki-hoon defended his gold medal at the 1994 Winter Olympics in Lillehammer, winning the 1000 metres with a time of 1:34.57.

Post career
In 2002, Kim was appointed as a coach of the Korean national short-track speed-skating team. He participated in the 2010 Winter Olympics in Vancouver as the head coach of the South Korean national team. Kim is currently serving as a full professor at Ulsan College.

References

External links
 
Kim Ki-hoon at International Skating Union

1967 births
Living people
South Korean male short track speed skaters
Olympic short track speed skaters of South Korea
Olympic gold medalists for South Korea
Olympic medalists in short track speed skating
Short track speed skaters at the 1988 Winter Olympics
Short track speed skaters at the 1992 Winter Olympics
Short track speed skaters at the 1994 Winter Olympics
Medalists at the 1992 Winter Olympics
Medalists at the 1994 Winter Olympics
Asian Games medalists in short track speed skating
Asian Games gold medalists for South Korea
Asian Games silver medalists for South Korea
Asian Games bronze medalists for South Korea
Short track speed skaters at the 1986 Asian Winter Games
Short track speed skaters at the 1990 Asian Winter Games
Medalists at the 1986 Asian Winter Games
Dankook University alumni
Medalists at the 1990 Asian Winter Games
South Korean male speed skaters
Universiade medalists in short track speed skating
Universiade bronze medalists for South Korea
Competitors at the 1989 Winter Universiade
Competitors at the 1991 Winter Universiade
South Korean Buddhists